Community-led housing (baugruppen:Germany, projets d'habitat participatif:France, habitat groupé:Belgium. social production of habitat:Latin America) is a method of forming future residents into a 'building group' who contribute to the design and development of new housing to meet their longer term needs, rather than leaving all design decisions to a developer looking to maximise the immediate financial return.

Working together in advance of construction helps to create a sense of community as members collaborate to identify their own priorities when designing their homes and shared spaces.

Groups of this sort were developing housing in Berlin in the early 2000s as the city was rebuilt following German reunification and emerging from a long tradition of self-initiated, community-oriented living and the shared responsibility of building in Germany.

Benefits 
Identified benefits of community-led housing include:
 Increased community confidence and cohesion: These are developed through the opportunity for the community to work together to influence their housing as formal stakeholders.
 Skills development and employment: This can include the development of practical skills that help to develop the homes, such as plastering, plumbing and tiling. It can also include skills such as project management and community mobilisation in the planning of homes.
 Addressing social challenges: Community-led housing projects can help to address social problems such as homelessness and loneliness. For example, certain projects help to tackle the challenges of supporting an elderly population.
 Provision for a long-term legally protected benefit to the local or specified community via retained income from the housing provided.

Key principles 

In 2016 key principles for community-led housing were developed collaboratively with several organisations representing community-led housing as part of an alliance building activity coordinated by Building and Social Housing Foundation (BSHF).

The key principles are:

 The community is integrally involved throughout the process in key decisions like what is provided, where, and for who. They don't necessarily have to initiate the conversation, or build homes themselves.
 There is a presumption that the community group will take a long term formal role in the ownership, stewardship or management of the homes.
 The benefits of the scheme to the local area and/or specified community group are clearly defined and legally protected in perpetuity.

Individual schemes are designed to fit the needs of the communities involved and achieve specific outcomes and wider benefits.

Terminology 
Terms used for this concept around the world include:
 Baugruppe or Baugruppen, which translates literally from German as 'building group'
 Social production of habitat (internationally used)
 Projets d'habitat participatif (France)
 Habitat groupé (Belgium)

Legal models
Common legal structures used to provide community-led housing in the UK include:

 Charitable incorporated organisation (CIO)
 Community association
 Community benefit society (CBS or Bencom)
 Community charitable trust
 Community housing association
 Community interest company (CIC)
 Community land trust (CLT)
 Company limited by guarantee
 Council TMO
 Development trust
 Housing association TMO
 Housing cooperative
 Industrial and provident society
 Mutual home ownership society
 Organisations with charitable status

See also
 Affordable housing
 Cohousing
 Cooperative

External links

References

Social care in the United Kingdom